The Black Tower is a novel by Richard A. Lupoff published by Bantam Books in 1988.

Plot summary
The Black Tower is the first book in Philip José Farmer's Dungeon series, taking place in a vast and mysterious world-size prison containing creatures from across time and space.

Reception
J. Michael Caparula reviewed The Black Tower in Space Gamer/Fantasy Gamer No. 85. Caparula commented that "The book is fast and at times fun, but be warned that it is far from a complete work. It seems to me that even novels that are part of a series should be able to stand on their own."

Reviews
Review by John Gilbert (1990) in Fear, February 1990

References

1988 American novels